James T. Kadonaga is an American biologist, currently the Amylin Endowed Chair in Lifesciences at University of California, San Diego.

Education
Kadonga has a bachelor's degree in chemistry from MIT, where he received the Alpha Chi Sigma Prize and the American Institute of Chemists Certificate. His graduate studies was at Harvard University under Jeremy R. Knowles.  He was a DuPont Fellow.

Awards 
 2022  Elected Member, National Academy of Sciences
 2017  Elected Member, American Academy of Arts and Sciences
 1995  Elected Member, American Academy of Microbiology
 1994  Elected Member, American Association for the Advancement of Science
 1992  Presidential Faculty Fellow Award, National Science Foundation

References

Year of birth missing (living people)
Living people
University of California, San Diego faculty
21st-century American biologists
Massachusetts Institute of Technology School of Science alumni
Harvard University alumni